Ed Rossbach (Chicago, 1914 – Berkeley, California, October 7, 2002) was an American fiber artist.

He earned a BA in Painting and Design at the University of Washington in Seattle, Washington in 1940, an MA in art education from Columbia University in New York City in 1941, and an MFA in ceramics and weaving from the Cranbrook Academy of Art in Bloomfield Hills, Michigan in 1947.

His career began in with ceramics and weaving in the 1940s, but evolved over the next decade into basket making.  He is best known for his innovative and playful baskets made from nontraditional materials such as plastic and newspaper. 

He taught at Puyallup Jr. High School in Puyallup, Washington from 1941 to 1942, at the University of Washington School of Art, in Seattle, Washington from 1947 to 1950, and at the University of California, Berkeley from 1950 to 1979. In 1950 he married Katherine Westphal, a textile designer, and creator of art quilts and wearable art. He died at age 88 after a prolonged illness on October 7, 2002.

References
 McQueen, John, John McQueen, the language of containment, essays by Vicki Halper and Ed Rossbach, Washington, D.C., Renwick Gallery, National Museum of American Art, Smithsonian Institution, 1991.
 Rossbach, Ed, The art of Paisley, New York, Van Nostrand Reinhold Co., 1980.
 Rossbach, Ed, Ed Rossbach, 40 years of exploration and innovation in fiber art, Asheville, N.C., Lark Books, 1990.
 Rossbach, Ed, The nature of basketry, West Chester, Pa., Schiffer Pub., 1986.
 Rossbach, Ed., The new basketry, New York, Van Nostrand Reinhold, 1976.
 Smith, Paul J., Ties that bind, fiber art by Ed Rossbach and Katherine Westphal from the Daphne Farago collection, Providence, RI, Museum of Art, Rhode Island School of Design, 1997.

Footnotes

1914 births
University of Washington School of Art + Art History + Design alumni
Teachers College, Columbia University alumni
Cranbrook Academy of Art alumni
American textile artists
University of Washington faculty
University of California, Berkeley faculty
2002 deaths
Columbia University School of the Arts alumni